This is a list of monuments in Żebbuġ, Gozo, Malta, which are listed on the National Inventory of the Cultural Property of the Maltese Islands.

List 

|}

References

Zebbug, Gozo
Żebbuġ, Gozo